Yorgiidae is an extinct family of cephalozoans, which lived 635 million years ago. They were filter fed.

Description
Like most proarticulates, they present semi-bilateral symmetry. They had a discoid appearance, with the body segmented by isomers.

Distribution
Ediacaran of Russian Federation and South Australia.

Gallery

See also

 Cephalozoa

References

Cephalozoa
Yorgiidae
Ediacaran life
Fossils of Russia